El Ogla is a town and commune in Robbah District, El Oued Province, Algeria. According to the 2008 census it has a population of 6,102, up from 4,715 in 1998, with an annual growth rate of 2.7%.

Climate 

El Ogla has a hot desert climate (Köppen climate classification BWh), with very hot summers and mild winters. Rainfall is light and sporadic, and summers are particularly dry.

Transportation 

It is also connected by local roads to the towns of Robbah and Nakhla to the north.

Education 

3.4% of the population has a tertiary education, and another 11.2% has completed secondary education. The overall literacy rate is 71.9%, and is 79.8% among males and 63.9% among females.

Localities 
The commune of El Ogla is composed of three localities:

 Ogla
 El Aguila
 Sendrous

References 

Neighbouring towns and cities

Communes of El Oued Province
El Oued Province